William Bagot, 4th Baron Bagot JP (19 January 1857 – 23 December 1932), was a British peer and Conservative politician and art collector.

Early life
Bagot was the eldest son of two sons and five daughters born to William Bagot, 3rd Baron Bagot, and his wife, the former Hon. Lucia Caroline Elizabeth Agar-Ellis. His mother was a daughter of George Agar-Ellis, 1st Baron Dover and his sister, Louisa Bagot, married Hamar Alfred Bass of the Bass Brewery family in 1879. His paternal grandparents were William Bagot, 2nd Baron Bagot and his second wife Lady Louisa Legge (daughter of George Legge, 3rd Earl of Dartmouth).

Bagot was educated at Eton.

Career
He was a Lieutenant-Colonel in the Staffordshire Yeomanry and a captain in the 3rd Staffordshire Rifle Volunteers and served as an Aide-de-Camp to the Governor General of Canada from 1876 to 1883. Bagot also held the office of Gentleman Usher of the Privy Chamber from 1885 to 1887 and was a Justice of the Peace for Derbyshire and Staffordshire. Between 1896 and 1901 he served as a Lord-in-waiting (government whip in the House of Lords) in the Conservative administration of Lord Salisbury. He also held a commission with the Staffordshire Imperial Yeomanry during the Second Boer War, which he resigned in November 1901.

Personal life

On 25 July 1903, Lord Bagot married the American Lilian Marie May (1863–1958) at Brompton Oratory. She was the youngest daughter of the late Henry May, a U.S. Representative from Maryland. The couple separated shortly after the christening of their only child, a daughter:

 Hon. Barbara Bagot (b. 1905), who married in Oscar Crosby Sewall, son of Oscar Trufant Sewall, of Bath, Maine in June 1934; they divorced in 1945 and remarried in 1950 to Patricia Leighton Wilkins.

Lord Bagot was an art collector and owned paintings by Sir Joshua Reynolds, Sir Peter Lely, Veronese, Albrecht Dürer, Anthony van Dyck, Bartolomé Esteban Murillo, Le Nain, Frans Hals, van Eyck, and valuable relics of the reign of King Charles I. He was also an avid shooter, hunter, and fisher on his estates of more than 30,000 acres.

Lord Bagot died at Blithfield Hall, Rugeley, 23 December 1932, aged 75, and was succeeded in his titles by his second cousin Gerald William Bagot, 5th Baron Bagot. Lady Bagot died 21 February 1958.

References

External links

1857 births
1932 deaths
People educated at Eton College
Gentlemen Ushers
Staffordshire Yeomanry officers
William 4